Johan Emil Kléen (17 September 1868 in Sätofta, Skåne – 10 December 1898 in Lund) was a Swedish journalist and poet. He was an admirer and protégé of August Strindberg.

See also
 Sedlighetsdebatten

References

1868 births
1898 deaths
Swedish poets
Swedish male writers
Swedish male poets
19th-century Swedish poets
19th-century male writers